Ahongsghangbam Sushil Meitei (born 8 February 1997) is an Indian professional footballer who plays as a winger for Mohammedan in the I-League.

Career

NorthEast United

On 23 July 2017, Sushil Meitei was drafted as a developmental player by NorthEast United in the 2017–18 ISL Players Draft. He made his debut in a match against ATK as an 83rd-minute substitution for Malemngamba Meitei.

Fateh Hyderabad

Sushil Meitei went on loan to Fateh Hyderabad after the end of 2017–18 ISL league stage. He made his debut for the team in a match against the FC Goa reserve squad, where he scored his debut goal and created two goals for his team.

Neroca FC
Sushil Meitei join NEROCA for the 2019–20 I-League season.

Career statistics

Club

Honours
Mohammedan Sporting
Calcutta Football League: 2021

References

1997 births
Living people
Indian footballers
Association football forwards
Footballers from Manipur
I-League players
I-League 2nd Division players
Royal Wahingdoh FC players
Fateh Hyderabad A.F.C. players
NorthEast United FC players
NEROCA FC players
Indian Super League players
Real Kashmir FC players